Ohebach may refer to:

Ohebach (Kehrenbach), a river of Hesse, Germany, tributary of the Kehrenbach
Ohebach (Efze), a river of Hesse, Germany, tributary of the Efze
Ohebach (Oker), a river of Lower Saxony, Germany, tributary  of the Oker